Leucaloa butti is a moth of the family Erebidae. It was described by Rothschild in 1910. It is found in South Africa.

References

 Natural History Museum Lepidoptera generic names catalog

Spilosomina
Moths described in 1910